The Municipal Chamber of São Paulo is the unicameral legislative body of the city of São Paulo, it was created in 1560 by the Governor General Mem de Sá and is one of the oldest in Brazil.

Note

External links
 Website

Municipal chambers in Brazil
Organisations based in São Paulo